Tye McGinn (born July 29, 1990) is a Canadian professional ice hockey left winger who is currently playing for the ERC Ingolstadt of the Deutsche Eishockey Liga (DEL). He is the brother of Jamie and Brock McGinn.

Playing career
McGinn was drafted in the fourth round (119th overall) of the 2010 NHL Entry Draft by the Philadelphia Flyers. After his third season of playing in the Quebec Major Junior Hockey League for the Gatineau Olympiques, he signed a three-year entry level contract with the Flyers on July 14, 2011. McGinn made his NHL debut on January 22, 2013 against the New Jersey Devils.  His first goal was scored two games later, on January 26, 2013, against Jose Theodore of the Florida Panthers.

On February 16, 2014, McGinn was involved in a brawl with Connor Murphy and the Portland Pirates. McGinn repeatedly punched Murphy at center ice. He was ejected and immediately charged with a fighting major. The incident was part of a late-game line brawl, in which 329 penalty minutes were assessed between both teams as well as six suspensions. McGinn received a one-game suspension for his actions.

On July 2, 2014, McGinn was traded by the Flyers to the San Jose Sharks in exchange for a third round pick in the 2015 NHL Entry Draft. McGinn made the Sharks opening night roster for the 2014–15 season. After 32 games with the Sharks on March 2, 2015 McGinn was claimed off waivers by the Arizona Coyotes.

On July 21, 2015, McGinn signed a one-year, two-way contract with the Tampa Bay Lightning. McGinn spent the majority of the 2015–16 season with the Syracuse Crunch, only appearing in two games for the Lighting. On June 28, 2016, the Lighting re-signed McGinn to a one-year, two-way contract extension.

On August 17, 2017, the Lightning once again signed McGinn to a one-year, two-way contract extension. On November 14, 2017, the Lightning traded McGinn back to Arizona along with Michael Leighton in exchange for Louis Domingue.

Prior to the beginning of the 2018–19 season, McGinn signed a one year contract with the Manitoba Moose on September 11, 2018. McGinn found a role on the checking line of the Moose, collecting 2 goals and 6 points in 26 games before he was traded by Manitoba to the Chicago Wolves for considerations from a NHL trade between the Moose's affiliate the Winnipeg Jets and the Vegas Golden Knights on January 3, 2019.

After going unsigned at the beginning of the 2020–21 season, McGinn opted to pursue a career overseas, signing a contract for the remainder of the season with the Fischtown Penguins of the DEL on January 12, 2021.

Career statistics

References

External links
 

1990 births
Adirondack Phantoms players
Arizona Coyotes players
Canadian ice hockey left wingers
Chicago Wolves players
Fischtown Pinguins players
Gatineau Olympiques players
ERC Ingolstadt players
Ice hockey people from Ontario
Ottawa 67's players
Living people
Manitoba Moose players
People from Centre Wellington
Philadelphia Flyers draft picks
Philadelphia Flyers players
San Jose Sharks players
Syracuse Crunch players
Tampa Bay Lightning players
Tucson Roadrunners players